Hermosillo is a Spanish surname. Notable people with the surname include:

Carlos Hermosillo (born 1964), Mexican footballer
Carmen Hermosillo (died 2008), American writer and poet
Jaime Humberto Hermosillo (1942–2020), Mexican film director
Michael Hermosillo (born 1995), American baseball outfielder
Víctor Hermosillo y Celada (born 1939), Mexican politician

Spanish-language surnames